Badley is a village and civil parish in Suffolk, England.  It is located between Stowmarket and Needham Market, in the Mid Suffolk district.  With an electorate of less than 100, it has an infrequent parish meeting rather than a parish council. The population is included in the town of Needham Market.

See also
St Mary's Church, Badley

External links
 
 History of Badley
 Stowmarket Sport (Grassroots coverage of sports, clubs and teams in a three-mile radius of Stowmarket)
 

Villages in Suffolk
Mid Suffolk District
Civil parishes in Suffolk